Anastasius of Pavia (sometimes Anastasius XV, or Anastasius II) was Bishop of Pavia (Ticinum)  from 668 until his death in 680.  He was a  convert from Arianism. He was succeeded by Damian of Pavia.

References

External links
St. Anastasius XV Catholic Online

680 deaths
Italian Roman Catholic saints
7th-century Italian bishops
Bishops of Pavia
Year of birth unknown